Jamale Aarrass (born 15 November 1981) is a French middle distance runner who specializes in the 800 metres and the 1500 metres.

International competitions

National titles
French Indoor Athletics Championships
1500 m: 2011

Personal bests

References

1981 births
Living people
French male middle-distance runners
Olympic male middle-distance runners
Olympic athletes of France
Athletes (track and field) at the 2012 Summer Olympics
21st-century French people